Drymophloeus is a genus of flowering plant in the family Arecaceae. It is native to New Guinea and nearby islands in Samoa and Maluku.

It contains the following species:
 Drymophloeus litigiosus (Becc.) H.E.Moore - New Guinea, Maluku
 Drymophloeus oliviformis (Giseke) Mart. - New Guinea, Maluku
 Drymophloeus whitmeeanus Becc. - Samoa

 formerly included

 Drymophloeus lepidotus H.E.Moore = Veitchia lepidota (H.E.Moore) C.Lewis & Zona - Solomon Islands
 Drymophloeus subdistichus (H.E.Moore) H.E.Moore = Veitchia subdisticha (H.E.Moore) C.Lewis & Zona - Solomon Islands

References

 
Arecaceae genera
Taxonomy articles created by Polbot